Murray Morrison Baker (1872–1964) was the first executive vice president of Holt Manufacturing Company that became Caterpillar Tractor Company. 

The Murray Baker Bridge, which carries Interstate 74 over the Illinois River, is named for Baker, as was Baker Hall, former home of the Foster College of Business Administration at Bradley University which was demolished in 2017.

References

1872 births
1964 deaths
American chief executives of manufacturing companies
Caterpillar Inc. people
People from Peoria, Illinois
Holt Manufacturing Company